The 9th Los Angeles Film Critics Association Awards, honoring the best filmmaking of 1983, were announced on 17 December 1983.

Winners
Best Picture:
Terms of Endearment
Runner-up: Tender Mercies
Best Director:
James L. Brooks – Terms of Endearment
Runner-up: Bruce Beresford – Tender Mercies
Best Actor:
Robert Duvall – Tender Mercies
Runner-up: Tom Conti – Reuben, Reuben
Best Actress:
Shirley MacLaine – Terms of Endearment
Runner-up: Jane Alexander – Testament
Best Supporting Actor:
Jack Nicholson – Terms of Endearment
Runner-up: John Lithgow – Terms of Endearment and Twilight Zone: The Movie
Best Supporting Actress:
Linda Hunt – The Year of Living Dangerously
Runner-up: Cher – Silkwood
Best Screenplay:
James L. Brooks – Terms of Endearment
Runner-up: Lawrence Kasdan and Barbara Benedek – The Big Chill
Best Cinematography:
Sven Nykvist – Fanny and Alexander (Fanny och Alexander)
Runner-up: Hiro Narita – Never Cry Wolf
Best Music Score:
Philip Glass – Koyaanisqatsi
Runner-up: Billy Goldenberg – Reuben, Reuben
Best Foreign Film:
Fanny and Alexander (Fanny och Alexander) • Sweden/France/West Germany
Experimental/Independent Film/Video Award:
Michael Snow – So Is This
New Generation Award:
Sean Penn
Career Achievement Award:
Myrna Loy
Special Citation:
Restored versions of A Star Is Born and The Leopard

References

External links
9th Annual Los Angeles Film Critics Association Awards

1983
Los Angeles Film Critics Association Awards
Los Angeles Film Critics Association Awards
Los Angeles Film Critics Association Awards
Los Angeles Film Critics Association Awards